Black Widow (Original Motion Picture Soundtrack) is the film score for the 2021 Marvel Studios film Black Widow. The score was composed by Lorne Balfe, with the soundtrack album being released by Hollywood Records on July 9, 2021.

Background
Alexandre Desplat was revealed to be composing the music for Black Widow in January 2020. Late in the film's post-production, Lorne Balfe replaced Desplat as composer, which Desplat confirmed in May 2020. Balfe's score was released digitally by Marvel Music and Hollywood Records on July 9, 2021. Black Widow director Cate Shortland believed Balfe had created a "soulful score that is really Russian".

Balfe employed London's Metro Voices for a 118-piece orchestra and a 60-voice choir singing Russian lyrics, with a 40-voice male choir and 20-voice female choir, doing takes with and without lyrics. These lyrics were adapted from Russian poetry by Alexander Pushkin, Leo Tolstoy and Mikhail Lermontov. Balfe said that "the music of the Red Army was also a massive influence", and that he "wanted to give Yelena that Red Army robustness with her theme." Balfe avoided more cliché Russian instruments like balalaikas as they "didn't fit the film" and could "become a parody".

Track listing
All music composed by Lorne Balfe.

Additional music
A cover of Nirvana's "Smells Like Teen Spirit" by Think Up Anger, featuring Malia J is used in the film's opening credits. Also featured are "American Pie" by Don McLean, Yelena Belova's favorite song as a child, "Cheap Thrills" by Sia and Sean Paul, "Bond Fights Snake" by John Barry, "Atshan Ya Zeina" by Ahmed Mohamed El Gaml, and "Rise Ye Soldiers of Salvation". Alan Silvestri's Avengers theme is also referenced in Balfe's score.

References

2021 soundtrack albums
2020s film soundtrack albums
Black Widow (2021 film)
Marvel Cinematic Universe: Phase Four soundtracks